Carlo Rossi (August 8, 1925 – April 11, 1998) was a Canadian politician.

Born in Montreal, Quebec, the son of Italian immigrants, Rossi joined the Service de police de la Ville de Montréal in 1948. He was a police detective and the head of the Police's hostage-negotiation team.

In 1979, he was elected to the House of Commons of Canada in the Montreal riding of Bourassa. A Liberal, he was re-elected in 1980 and 1984. He was defeated in 1988. From 1982 to 1984, he was the Parliamentary Secretary to the Minister of State (Multiculturalism).

Electoral record (incomplete)

External links
 

1925 births
1998 deaths
Canadian people of Italian descent
Liberal Party of Canada MPs
Members of the House of Commons of Canada from Quebec
Politicians from Montreal
Service de police de la Ville de Montréal
Burials at Notre Dame des Neiges Cemetery